The seventh season of Gran Hermano Argentina started on November 2, 2011 on Telefe. The show's length was approximately five months, finished on April 16, 2012. The prize has been increased to AR$1,000,000 (USD235,000) which will be reduced according to how many times a housemate is nominated. The show is hosted by Jorge Rial, who has hosted the show since 2007, until January 13, 2012 when he left the show. Rial was replaced by Mariano Peluffo, who hosted Gran Hermano spinoff shows.

After surviving 164 Days (a record in the Americas at the time), Rodrigo Fernandez became the winner, at age 19 became the youngest person to ever win the Argentinian series. All four finalists (Rodrigo, Walquiria, Jorge & Alex) on finale night became the Big Brother contestants in the continent with the most survived days in a single series.

This series beat the record length (lasting 164 Days, the previous one lasted 141 Days) set during the previous season and became the longest series ever produced of any Big Brother show in the Americas. Also, this was the last series to air in Telefe, until 2022 when the network took over the format once more and greenlit the show's tenth civilian season.

The House

The season 7 House is the same as the season 6 but it has been redecorated and added a new style. This season has another house called La casa de al lado (The House Next Door), where 4 potential housemates will live there until they pass to the main house, decision made by the public votes by SMS.

Housemates

The first name means two points and the second one, one point.

Nominations table
The first housemate in each box was nominated for two points, and the second housemate was nominated for one point.
 - This housemate could send half of their points to another housemate.
 - This housemate own the power to save one of the nominated housemates.
 - This housemate was saved by housemate.
 - This housemate could avoid a housemate's nomination.

Notes

References

External links 
 Official site

2011 Argentine television seasons
2012 Argentine television seasons
07